The Scumfrog (Jesse Houk) (born October 3, 1971) is a Dutch-American DJ/remixer/producer/artist, mostly known for his underground flavored remixes of artists like Kylie Minogue, Missy Elliott, New Order, and Annie Lennox and his collaborations writing and producing techno-oriented works with David Bowie, Cyndi Lauper, and Sting. He released four albums as a solo artist (Extended Engagement 2003, Simmer 2004, A Place Where We Belong 2011 and In Case We're All Still Here 2013). As a DJ, he has toured the world many times over, between 2008 and 2014 he hosted and produced the weekly radio show/podcast Glam Scum International, and in 2015 he launched a new series of club nights named M.B.T.S.(Most Below The Surface).

Biography

Early career: 1997 – 2001
Jesse Houk was born in Amsterdam, Netherlands, to an American father and a Dutch mother. After finishing college, his dual citizenship allowed him to move to New York City in 1997 where he started producing music under his new alias The Scumfrog. Between 1997 and 2000 he lived between New York City—where he DJ’d Deep House and Tech House in NY's East Village lounges such as the Opium Den – and the Netherlands where he worked with his production partner Jacques Sperwer.  Jacques and Jesse released several singles under various names such as Jake & Jesse, Barbarus and a full-length album on BMG Bertelsmann Music Group under the name Resonance. In this period he also recorded his first work under the Scumfrog alias, called The Watersong, which was selected by Danny Tenaglia -- DJ Magazine’s number 1 DJ in the world at the time -- for his Global Underground Athens compilation.

After the underground buzz of The Watersong, The Scumfrog signed an album deal with Roger Sanchez, who also took him as his opening DJ on his 2001 tour. That summer, The Scumfrog single “We Love You” (based on the Beatles/Rolling Stones collaboration) went to number one in most European dance charts and put the Scumfrog name on the map.

2001 – 2007: Remixing, Extended Engagement, Simmer
The Scumfrog career has largely been marked by an ability to work with mainstream artists without sacrificing his underground sound. Between 2001 and 2007, The Scumfrog scored more than 10 number 1 Billboard Hot Dance Music/Club Play records remixing mainstream artists like Britney Spears, Enrique Iglesias, Annie Lennox, Jewel, J-pop superstar Hikaru Utada but rarely ever making full vocal remixes of the artists he worked with. His EMI collaboration with David Bowie, remixing his 1984 single “Loving the Alien,” set the tone for a career that would thrive simultaneously in underground clubs and in mainstream recording studios. While on duty for the stars, he never stopped remixing for respected underground Dance Music labels such as Positiva, Intec, Yoshitoshi Recordings, Bedrock Records and Strictly Rhythm, doing remixes for his DJ peers such as Steve Lawler, Planet Funk, Boris Dlugosh, and Dirty Vegas.

His first album, Extended Engagement (2003, EMI/Positiva/Effin) was a two disc mix compilation exclusively of his own productions and remixes, including his own singles "We Love You", "Music Revolution", and "Learning To Fly".

Jesse released more radio-friendly records under the alias Dutch, getting his first number one on the Billboard Hot Dance Music/Club Play chart in 2003, "My Time" which he co-wrote with vocalist Crystal Waters. The follow-up to "My Time" was the single "Why Should I Think About The Rain", featuring Grammy winning singer/songwriter and Rolling Stones back-up singer Lisa Fischer.

In 2004, The Scumfrog won the International Dance Music Award (IDMA) for 'Best Remixer' of 2003.

His second album Simmer (2004, Effin) was the first album where Jesse himself wrote all the songs (no remixes of other artists). It featured the singles "Music Revolution", "Simmer", "Come On", and a duet "Bacon" with his longtime friend, singer Lucy Woodward. Simmer did not have a huge impact, largely because it was marketed and promoted solely by The Scumfrog's own label, and because the songs on the album were not nearly as DJ-friendly as his previous work.

In 2005, The Scumfrog's most successful single "Music Revolution" was chosen for Chevrolet's long running Chevrolet HHR commercial on TV and radio. In the same year, Jesse formed the band DJs Are Alive with fellow DJ/performers DJ Skribble, D:Fuse, Static Revenger and Kristine W. The band's mission was to sound like a DJ set and look like a band. DJs Are Alive performed a series of shows in 2006, but disbanded allegedly due to continuing scheduling conflicts with their gigs as individual DJs.

In 2006, the Scumfrog released another mix compilation Mega Scum 1, which became an industry sensation because of its artwork; Jesse himself posing in a bikini on the cover in an attempt to parody the culture of hot girls on the cover of dance music compilations.

During this period nearly all of The Scumfrog's artist releases were on Effin Records, his own label with manager/partner Steve Rosen, and although the label never attained massive commercial success it proved to a valuable laboratory for the work that was to come.

Upon his return to the US after a long European tour in 2007, Jesse decided to trade his New York City home for the desert and mountains of New Mexico where he lived until 2015.

2007 – present: Grammy nomination, Glam Scum International, donations
One of the biggest successes of his career came in the form of an unreleased Scumfrog remix of Peter Bjorn & John "The Young Folks", which went viral during the summer of 2007, and in its unreleased bootleg form made it to the playlists of many mainstream radio stations. At the same time, his collaboration with Italian DJ/Producer Tommy Vee in covering Steve Miller Band's 1970s hit "Serenade" also made it into many European pop-charts.

In 2008, the Scumfrog started a weekly hour-long radio show Glam Scum on Sirius Satellite Radio in the US.  A year later, after a merger between Sirius and Satellite radio company XM, the show was dropped, and the show was re-launched as Glam Scum International and licensed to several radio stations around the world.

During 2007, The Scumfrog had been writing and recording with Cyndi Lauper in New York on her dance music album Bring Ya To The Brink.  Their song "High and Mighty" became the opening track of the album, which was released in 2008 and nominated for a Grammy Award in the category ‘Best Dance Album’ in 2009. (The album lost to fellow nominees Daft Punk.)

In 2011, The Scumfrog reunited with his underground roots in the custom-made DJ set "A Place Where We Belong". Similarly to his debut album Extended Engagement, the mix consists of 12 original productions (some his own, some remixes of other artists). Jesse himself announced that he did not want to call it an album because ‘DJs are not supposed to make albums, DJs are supposed to make DJ mixes’. The new material was offered in a non-stop DJ mix on his Facebook page where – in a video – Jesse explained his voluntary donation system for his new music. Many of the songs on "A Place Where We Belong" were licensed to labels for single-release. "In Love" was released on Umek’s label 1605, "Illusion" came out on Floorplay, "Running" on Inkfish, and "Don’t Give Up" featuring Vassy (a cover of Peter Gabriel and Kate Bush) on Armada.

Armada Music released The Scumfrog's fourth album, In Case We're All Still Here in 2013, which features his collaboration with Sting. The two teamed up to remake Sting's 1993 hit "If I Ever Lose My Faith in You".

In 2015, he released the single "Send Wave" on Hot Since 82 label Knee Deep In Sound.

DJ career
As a DJ, The Scumfrog has toured the world many times over. Even though he has played many festivals over the past ten years (Burning Man being his favorite), he makes it clear that he prefers smaller venues with great sound systems for the music that he plays. In 2015, he started a new brand of small-room underground clubbing named M.B.T.S.(Most Below The Surface).

Personal life
Jesse Houk currently lives in Nassau, Bahamas.

Discography

Albums
Extended Engagement (2003)
Simmer (2004)
Mega Scum! 01 (2006)
A Place Where We Belong (2011)
In Case We're All Still Here (2013)

Singles
 1997 The Watersong
 2000 Learning To Fly
 2001 We Love You
 2002 Loving The Alien (with David Bowie)
 2002 Deep Sleep Dub (with Michael Moog)
 2002 Music Revolution
 2004 Simmer
 2004 Come On
 2005 Let The Sun Shine (with Cevin Fisher)
 2006 Like Paradise (with Cevin Fisher)
 2006 Secret (with Sarah Tancer)
 2006 Dirty Extra
 2006 Beat As One
 2007 Chicks For Free
 2007 I Remember
 2007 Serenade (with Tommy Vee)
 2007 Hear Me
 2008 Stereo & Video (with D:Fuse)
 2008 Into The Deep (with Static Revenger and David Gausa)
 2009 Escape (with Polina)
 2009 Sandia
 2009 How Does It Feel (with Tommy Vee & Static Revenger)
 2010 Undone
 2010 Showtime
 2011 All Go Down (with Davey La)
 2011 Illusion
 2011 Don't Give Up (with Vassy)
 2011 In Love
 2012 Schroeder In Wonderland
 2012 Running
 2012 Clones/Middle Earth
 2013 Lost Your Number
 2013 Dionysian
 2013 Downtown
 2014 Wave2
 2015 Send Wave
 2015 The Woods
 2015 Hideout
 2015 Spin
 2015 Chemiquamour
 2019 Antarctica

Remixes
 1999 First Choice - The Player
 2000 Danny Morales - The Fiend
 2001 Boris Dlugosch - Never Enough
 2001 Sono - Keep Control
 2001 Milk & Honey - You, Me & The Music
 2002 Mr. Hermano - Free As The Morning Sun
 2002 George Michael - Freeek
 2002 Milo - Jungle Of Mirrors
 2002 Roger Goode - In The Beginning
 2002 New Order - Here To Stay
 2002 Kylie Minogue - Love At First Sight
 2002 Dirty Vegas - Days Go By
 2002 Eclipse 29 - You're Not Alone
 2002 iiO - At The End
 2003 Tomas vs. Filterheadz - Sunshine
 2003 Pure Orange - Feel Alive
 2003 Monica - So Gone
 2003 Lucy Woodward - Blindsided
 2003 Planet Funk - The Switch
 2003 Annie Lennox - Pavement Cracks
 2003 Double Dee - Shining
 2003 Dutch feat. Crystal Waters - My Time
 2003 Skin - Faithfulness
 2003 Jewel - Stand
 2003 Kristine W - Fly Again
 2003 Enrique Iglesias - Addicted
 2003 Dido - White Flag
 2004 Missy Elliott - Pass That Dutch
 2004 Spawn Blond - Waterfalls
 2004 Murk - Time
 2004 Nars - Dope Dope Dope
 2004 Amiel - Love Song
 2004 Britney Spears - Everytime
 2004 Utada - Devil Inside
 2004 Slacker - Best Boyfriend
 2005 Cevin Fisher & The Scumfrog - Let The Sun Shine
 2005 M-Flo - I Wanna Be Down
 2005 Fantasia - It's All Good
 2005 Squat 84 - Say No
 2005 Chocolate Puma - 4 Letter Word
 2005 Rob Thomas - Lonely No More
 2005 Robbie Rivera - Some Kind Of Heaven
 2005 Annie - Heartbeat
 2005 Missy Elliott - Lose Control
 2005 Rob Thomas - This Is How A Heart Breaks
 2005 Dutch feat. Lisa Fischer - (Why Should I) Think About The Rain
 2005 Emilia - Back To Me
 2006 Static Revenger - So High
 2006 Astro & Glyde - I Know What You Like
 2006 Kelis - Bossy
 2006 Paris Hilton - Stars Are Blind
 2006 Syke & Sugerstarr - Are You Watching Me
 2006 Simple Minds - Different World
 2006 Static Revenger - So High
 2006 Zum Schneider - Crazy
 2007 Tommy Vee feat. The Scumfrog - I Would Die For You
 2007 Gaby & The Scumfrog - Broken Disco
 2007 Rafael Frost - Run To You
 2007 Meck feat. Dino - Feels Like Home
 2007 Cupid - Cupid Shuffle
 2008 Dr. Kucho! - Groover's Delight
 2008 Static Revenger & Love Song Surprise - Satellite
 2009 Peter Gelderblom - Lost
 2009 Nadia Ali - Love Story
 2009 Franklin Fuentes - The Robots (Are Coming!)
 2009 The Singhs - Beautiful Thing
 2009 IAM ONE - Missy
 2009 Polina - Shotguns
 2010 Victoria Aitken - Sunshine
 2010 Tommy Vee & Mauro Ferrucci - Old Skool Generation
 2010 Natalia Flores - Going Strong
 2010 Geoffery Paris - Money! & What!
 2010 (Never Mind The) Stars - France
 2010 Mumiy Troll - Polar Bear
 2011 Dennis Ruyer - A Night At The Opera
 2011 Tiny Trendies - The Sky Is Not Crying
 2011 Mason feat. Aqualung - Little Angel
 2011 Markus Binpafl aka BIG WORLD - Meganite
 2012 Larry Powers - Aurora Snow
 2012 Armin Van Buuren - We Are Here To Make Some Noise
 2013 Methodrone - Stop Start
 2013 Meandisco & Daniel Wilde - The Day I Set You Free

See also
List of number-one dance hits (United States)
List of artists who reached number one on the US Dance chart

References

External links
TheScumfrog.com - Website of The Scumfrog
GlamScum.com -  web site to The Scumfrog's Radio Show and Podcast

1971 births
Living people
Dutch house musicians
Club DJs
Remixers
Musicians from Amsterdam
Dutch people of American descent
American house musicians
American people of Dutch descent